Auchindoun is a rural hamlet in Moray, Scotland.

It is located some 2.5 miles east of Dufftown, which describes itself as "The Malt Whisky Capital". The hamlet is mainly on the eastern bank of the River Fiddich. Nearby is the ruined Auchindoun Castle.

One source suggests the meaning of Achadh an Dùin to be "the field of the mound/tower."

References

External links
 Auchindoun Homepage
 Auchindoun Castle
 Auchindoun Castle at Historic Scotland

Villages in Moray
Hamlets in Scotland